Las Caletas is a beach near Puerto Vallarta, Jalisco, Mexico. The home of Hollywood director John Huston was once located there. Caletas is now leased and operated by Vallarta Adventures, a tour provider.

References

External links

Las Caletas Website'''

Beaches of Jalisco
Puerto Vallarta